Forney High School is a public secondary school located in Forney, Texas, United States. It is one of two high schools in the Forney Independent School District which serves Forney, Talty, the small Kaufman County portion of Mesquite, and some surrounding unincorporated areas of Kaufman County.  Because of immense growth over the past years, a bond was approved to begin construction of a second high school in May 2007. US Highway 80 serves as the boundary between the two high schools. Beginning in 2009, North Forney High School only housed freshmen and sophomores so the first graduating class will be in 2012.  In 2011, the school was rated "Academically Acceptable" by the Texas Education Agency.

Activities
Forney High School has several award-winning organizations including track and field, powerlifting, football, drill team, UIL academic teams, Special Olympics teams, band, and choir. City Bank Stadium is one of the few high school football stadiums in the country with privately owned naming rights.  FHS varsity football, soccer, and track compete in the stadium. The school won its first state championship in history in June 2018 when the softball team defeated Richmond Foster 4-1.

In 2014, Forney High School was recognized as having a certified Project Lead the Way high school engineering program.

School uniforms
All Forney ISD students are required to wear school uniforms, although jeans are sometimes allowed.

The Texas Education Agency specified that the parental guardians of students zoned to a school with uniforms may apply for a waiver to opt out of the uniform policy.  Parents must provide legitimate reasons, which are usually religious or philosophical in nature.

Forney High School has opt-out days periodically throughout the course of the year to celebrate special occasions such as home game days.

Notable alumni
Caleb Hanie (Class of 2004), NFL quarterback, Chicago Bears (08-09), Denver Broncos (2012), Baltimore Ravens (2013), Cleveland Browns (2013)
Don Willett (Class of 1984), justice of the Texas Supreme Court
John Wiley Price (Class of 1968), first African-American Dallas County Commissioner

References

External links
 Forney High School
 Texas Education Agency

Schools in Kaufman County, Texas
Public high schools in Texas